The Continental Cup 2005–06 was the ninth edition of the IIHF Continental Cup. The season started on September 23, 2005, and finished on January 9, 2006.

The tournament was won by Lada Togliatti, who led the final group.

Preliminary round

Group A
(Bucharest, Romania)

Group A standings *

*:  CS Progym Gheorgheni forfeit from the tournament

Group B
(Ankara, Turkey)

Group B standings

First Group Stage

Group C
(Elektrėnai, Lithuania)

Group C standings

Group D
(Grenoble, France)

Group D standings

Group E
(Minsk, Belarus)

Group E standings

 HK Acroni Jesenice     :  bye

Second Group Stage

Group F
(Jesenice, Slovenia)

Group F standings

 Alba Volán Székesfehérvár,
 ZSC Lions,
 Lada Togliatti     :  bye

Final stage

Final Group
(Székesfehérvár, Hungary)

Final Group standings

References
 Continental Cup 2006

2005–06 in European ice hockey
IIHF Continental Cup